Banned books are books or other printed works such as essays or plays which are prohibited by law or to which free access is not permitted by other means. The practice of banning books is a form of censorship, from political, legal, religious, moral, or (less often) commercial motives. This article lists notable banned books and works, giving a brief context for the reason that each book was prohibited. Banned books include fictional works such as novels, poems and plays and non-fiction works such as biographies and dictionaries.

Since there are a large number of banned books, some publishers have sought out to publish these books. The best-known examples are the Parisian Obelisk Press, which published Henry Miller's sexually frank novel Tropic of Cancer, and Olympia Press, which published William Burroughs's Naked Lunch.  Both of these, the work of father Jack Kahane and son Maurice Girodias, specialized in English-language books which were prohibited, at the time, in Great Britain and the United States. , also located in Paris, specialized in books prohibited in Spain during the dictatorship of Francisco Franco. Russian literature prohibited during the Soviet period was published outside of Russia.

In many territories, distribution, promotion, or certain translations of the Bible have historically been prohibited or impeded. See Censorship of the Bible.

Many countries throughout the world have their own methods of restricting access to books, although the prohibitions vary strikingly from one country to another.

Despite the opposition from the American Library Association (ALA), books continue to be banned by school and public libraries across the United States. This is usually the result of complaints from parents, who find particular books not appropriate for their children (e.g., books about sexual orientation such as And Tango Makes Three). In many libraries, including the British Library and the Library of Congress, erotic books are housed in separate collections in restricted access reading rooms. In some libraries, a special application may be needed to read certain books. Libraries sometimes avoid purchasing controversial books, and the personal opinions of librarians have at times affected book selection.

Albania

Argentina

Australia

Austria

Bangladesh

Belgium

Bosnia and Herzegovina

Brazil

Canada

Chile

China

Czechoslovakia

Egypt

El Salvador

Eritrea

France

Germany

Greece

Guatemala

India

Indonesia

Iran

Ireland

Italy

Japan

Kenya

Kuwait

Lebanon

Liberia

Malaysia

Morocco

Mauritius

Nepal

Netherlands

New Zealand

Nigeria

Norway

Pakistan

Papal States

Papua New Guinea

Philippines

Poland

Portugal

Qatar

Roman Empire

Russia

Saudi Arabia

Senegal

Singapore

South Africa

South Korea

Spain

Sri Lanka

Tanzania

Taiwan

Thailand

United Arab Emirates

United Kingdom

United States

Uzbekistan

Vietnam

Yugoslavia

See also
 Censorship by country
 Criticism of Amazon
 Areopagitica: A speech of Mr John Milton for the liberty of unlicensed printing to the Parliament of England
 Book burning
 Burning of books and burying of scholars
 Challenge (literature)
 International Freedom of Expression Exchange
 List of authors and works on the Index Librorum Prohibitorum
 List of banned films
 List of banned video games
 List of book burning incidents

References

Further reading
 Banned Books, 4 volumes, Facts on File Library of World Literature, 2006.
 Literature Suppressed on Political Grounds 
 Literature Suppressed on Religious Grounds 
 Literature Suppressed on Sexual Grounds 
 Literature Suppressed on Social Grounds 
 Academic freedom in Indonesia, Human Rights Watch, 1998
 Paying the price: freedom of expression in Turkey, Lois Whitman, Thomas Froncek, Helsinki Watch, 1989

External links
 Beacon For Freedom of Expression
 The Literature Police: Apartheid Censorship and its Cultural Consequences
 New Zealand Office of Film & Literature Classification
 Australia classification board
 UK libraries "Banned books 2011" challenging censorship in literature
 Banned Books That Shaped America
 Banned Books and Prints in Europe and the United States, 17th–20th Centuries

Freedom of expression
Lists of prohibited books
Lists of controversial books
Human rights-related lists
Government-related lists
Blacklisting